The Malvinas Basin is a major sedimentary basin in the Argentine Shelf offshore southern Patagonia. The basin borders to the west with the Río Chico-Dungeness High that separates it from the Magallanes Basin. The southern boundary is formed by the Scotia plate boundary. Contrary to the neighbouring North Falkland and Magallanes Basins, the Malvinas Basin is not known to have commercial hydrocarbon reserves.

Tectonic history 
The Malvinas Basin started to form with the break-up of Pangea since the Early Jurassic.

Stratigraphy 
Though poorly understood due to the lack of well data, several formations were identified in the basin on the basis of 2D seismic, of which some also crop out in onshore Patagonia and the Austral Basin:

See also 
 List of fossiliferous stratigraphic units in the Falkland Islands
 Geology of the Falkland Islands
 Golfo San Jorge Basin
 Antarctic Peninsula

References

Bibliography 
 
 
 

Sedimentary basins of Argentina
Basins
Basins
Basins